The flag of South Sudan was adopted following the signing of the Comprehensive Peace Agreement that ended the Second Sudanese Civil War. A similar version of the flag was previously used as the flag of the Sudan People's Liberation Movement. The flag of South Sudan is older than the country itself, as the flag was adopted in 2005, while the country became independent in 2011.

History
When Sudan became independent in 1956, the predominantly Christian people living in the south of the country had no regional symbols, while the already dominant Muslim north displayed Islamic symbols on the national flag. Before independence, the British government had arranged for appropriate local symbols for the regions in Sudan, but the new government in independent Sudan had opposed the use of these symbols as being counterproductive to fostering national unity.

From the outset, the southern Sudanese felt discriminated against by the Islamic north. The southerners fought a drawn-out and bloody civil war to gain their independence, followed by a peace agreement in 2005 that included a referendum on independence in the south. The referendum was passed with overwhelming support in 2011, and South Sudan became officially independent on 9 July that same year. In the 1990s, during their struggle with the north, the southern Sudanese had created a banner of independence, which would become the new national flag. The flag was designed by Samuel Ajak, who was an artist and brigadier general for the Sudan People's Liberation Army under revolutionary leader John Garang.

Description
The flag bears striking similarities with both the flags of Sudan and Kenya. It shares the black, white, red, and green of the Sudanese flag (although different symbolism is given to each of the colours), in addition to having a chevron along the hoist. The horizontal black, white, red, and green bands of the flag share the same design as the Kenyan flag, and the Pan-African symbolism thereof. Another main difference between the flags of Sudan and South Sudan is that there is a yellow star inside the blue triangle that represents the unity of South Sudan.

In an illustration of the contrasting regional orientation of the two Sudans, the flag of Sudan shares the stripes of the Egyptian flag, while the flag of South Sudan shares the stripes of the Kenyan flag.

Colour scheme

Symbolism and representation
The South Sudanese government specifies that the colours of the flag are there to represent these descriptions of South Sudan:
 Black: Represents the people of South Sudan.
 Red: Represents blood that was shed for the independence of the country.
 Green: Represents the country's agricultural, natural wealth, land, as well as progress
 White:  Represents South Sudan's peace attained after many years of the liberation struggle.
 Blue: Represents waters of the Nile River, a source of life for the country.
 Yellow: Represents unity (of the states), hope, and determination for all people.

History

South Sudan as part of Anglo-Egyptian Sudan

South Sudan as part of the Republic of Sudan

Republic of South Sudan

Other flags

Government flags

Military flags

Political party flags

Miscellaneous flags

Sub-national flags
South Sudan is currently divided into ten states, two administrative areas and one area with special administrative status. The ten states have all adopted distinctive state flags.

States

Administrative areas

Municipalities

Regions

See also

 Coat of arms of South Sudan
 South Sudan Oyee!
Flag of Sudan

Notes

References

External links

 Timeline of South Sudan by BBC News

South Sudan
National symbols of South Sudan
South Sudan
South Sudan